The 2022–23 III liga is the 15th season of the fourth tier domestic division in the Polish football league system since its establishment in 2008 under its current title (III liga) and the 7th season under its current league division format. The league was operated by the Polish Football Association (PZPN).

The competition is contested by 72 clubs split geographically across 4 groups of 18 teams, with the winners of each group gaining promotion to the II liga. The season is played in a round-robin tournament. It began on 5 August 2022 and will conclude on 18 June 2023. The teams included semi-professional clubs (although a few are professional) and the reserve teams of professional clubs.

Format

72 teams are divided into four groups according to geographical criteria:
 Group I (Łódź – Masovian – Podlaskie – Warmian-Masurian)
 Group II (Kuyavian-Pomeranian – Greater Poland – Pomeranian – West Pomeranian)
 Group III (Lower Silesian – Lubusz – Opole – Silesian)
 Group IV (Świętokrzyskie – Lesser Poland – Lublin – Podkarpackie)

Since 2021–22 season each group of III liga is operated by Polish Football Association (PZPN), not a different voivodship football association.

Changes from last season
The following teams have changed division since the 2021–22 season.

To III liga

From III liga

League tables

Group 1

Błonianka Błonie
Broń Radom
Concordia Elbląg
Jagiellonia II Białystok
Lechia Tomaszów Mazowiecki
Legia II Warszawa
Legionovia Legionowo
ŁKS II Łódź
Mławianka Mława
Olimpia Zambrów
Pelikan Łowicz
Pilica Białobrzegi
Pogoń Grodzisk Mazowiecki
Sokół Ostróda
Świt Nowy Dwór Mazowiecki
Unia Skierniewice
Ursus Warszawa
Warta Sieradz

Group 2

Bałtyk Gdynia
Błękitni Stargard
Cartusia Kartuzy
Gedania Gdańsk
Jarota Jarocin
KP Starogard Gdański
Olimpia Grudziądz
Pogoń II Szczecin
Pogoń Nowe Skalmierzyce
Polonia Środa Wielkopolska
Sokół Kleczew
Stolem Gniewino
Świt Szczecin
Unia Janikowo
Unia Swarzędz
Unia Solec Kujawski
Vineta Wolin
Zawisza Bydgoszcz

Group 3

Carina Gubin
Chrobry II Głogów
Górnik II Zabrze
Gwarek Tarnowskie Góry
Lechia Zielona Góra
LKS Goczałkowice Zdrój
Miedż II Legnica
MKS Kluczbork
Odra Wodzisław Śląski
Pniówek Pawłowice Śląskie
Polonia Bytom
Polonia Nysa
Raków II Częstochowa
Rekord Bielsko-Biała
Stal Brzeg
Stilon Gorzów Wielkopolski
Ślęza Wrocław
Warta Gorzów Wielkopolski

Group 4

Avia Świdnik
Chełmianka Chełm
Cracovia II
Czarni Połaniec
Korona II Kielce
KS Wiązownica
KSZO Ostrowiec Świętokrzyski
Lublinianka Lublin
ŁKS Łagów
Orlęta Radzyń Podlaski
Podhale Nowy Targ
Podlasie Biała Podlaska
Sokół Sieniawa
Stal Stalowa Wola
Unia Tarnów
Wieczysta Kraków
Wisła Sandomierz
Wisłoka Dębica

See also
2022–23 Ekstraklasa
2022–23 I liga
2022–23 II liga
2022–23 Polish Cup

References

External link
 Official website 

2022–23
2022–23 in Polish football
Poland